Bozikas is a village in the municipality of Sikyona, Corinthia, Greece. The red wine Agiorgitiko is grown in the region. Olive oil is also produced in Bozikas.

External links
 -Bozikas

References

Populated places in Corinthia